The 2010–11 TFF Third League (also known as Spor-Toto Third League due to sponsorship reasons) is the 10th season of the league since its establishment in 2001 as the fourth level division; and the 40th season of the third league in Turkish football since its establishment in 1967–68 (before 2001 league was played as third level division).

League was started with 54 teams in three groups: Groups 1, 2 and 3, each consisting 18. Winner of each group promoted to 2011–12 TFF Second League. A playoff series were played among the best four teams in each group to determine the three more teams to promote. Bottom three teams in each groups were relegated to 2011–12 Regional Amateur League.

The start date of the league was 5 September 2010. Normal season was completed on 15 May 2011. Play-off round was played between 23–27 May 2011.

Teams

Note: By the end of season. Source: TFF coach search.

Group 1

Group 1 league table

Group 1 positions by round

Group 1 results

Group 1 top goalscorers
Including matches played on 15 May 2011;Source: TFF Third League page

Group 2

Group 2 league table

Group 2 positions by round

Group 2 results

Note: Erzurumspor did not show up in two games and relegated to regional amateur league. Games awarded to opponents 3-0.

Group 2 top goalscorers
Including matches played on 15 May 2011;Source: TFF Third League page

Group 3

Group 3 league table

Group 3 positions by round

Group 3 results

Note: Torbalıspor did not show up in İstanbul against Gaziosmanpaşa for 9th round game.

Group 3 top goalscorers
Including matches played on 15 May 2011;Source: TFF Third League page

Promotion playoffs
In each group, teams ranked second through fifth competed in the promotion playoffs for the 2011–12 TFF Second League. The 2nd team and 5th team, and 3rd and 4th teams played one match in a neutral venue. Winners played finals. Winner of the final became the second team in each group to promote to TFF Second League 2011-2012.

Group 1

Semifinals:

Finals:

Group 2

Semifinals:

Finals:

Group 3

Semifinals:

Finals:

References

See also
 2010–11 Türkiye Kupası
 2010–11 Süper Lig
 2010–11 TFF First League
 2010–11 TFF Second League

TFF Third League seasons
3